Hellyer County Park is one of 28 Santa Clara County Parks. The park is located just off of Highway 101 in San Jose, California, United States. The  park is home to Hellyer Park Velodrome and Cottonwood Lake. Other recreational opportunities at the park include picnicking, hiking, fishing, biking, and a playground. Coyote Creek Parkway is a jurisdiction of the Santa Clara County Parks. Coyote Creek Trail continues to the north along Coyote Creek under the jurisdiction of San Jose city parks.

References 

Parks in San Jose, California
Regional parks in California